The mixed doubles soft tennis event was part of the soft tennis programme and took place between August 29 and 30, at the Jakabaring Sport City Tennis Court. Yu Kai-wen and Cheng Chu-ling of Chinese Taipei won the gold medal in this event.

Schedule
All times are Western Indonesia Time (UTC+07:00)

Results
Legend
WO — Won by walkover

Preliminary round

Group A

Group B

Group C

Group D

Group E

Group F

Group G

Group H

Knockout round

References

External links 
Soft tennis at the 2018 Asian Games – Mixed doubles

Soft tennis at the 2018 Asian Games